George I of Antioch (Syriac: Mor Gewargis) was the Patriarch of Antioch, and head of the Syriac Orthodox Church from 758 until his death in 790.

Biography
George was born in Baltan, near Emesa, into a family of Melkites. He became a Jacobite and studied Syriac and Greek at the Monastery of Qenneshre, as well as philology, theology and jurisprudence. Here he was later ordained as a deacon.

In December 758, a synod was held in Mabbogh to elect a new patriarch, however, a consensus could not be reached and George was imposed as patriarch. John, bishop of Raqqa, and other bishops of Mesopotamia, did not recognise George as patriarch and John was elected patriarch. The Caliph al-Mansur supported John and thus George was prohibited from residing at the patriarchal seat at Antioch and resided at several monasteries during this time. John continued to pose as patriarch until his death in 762/763 AD.

In 764/765 AD, a synod was held at Serug to attempt to heal the division within the church. Negotiations were unsuccessful as George refused to recognise the bishops consecrated by John of Raqqa whilst posing as patriarch. From 765 to 766, George resided at the Monastery of Zuqnîn near Amid. A meeting was held in 766 between the two camps in the palace of the Caliph al-Mansur and David of Dara was appointed patriarch by the Caliph. George was imprisoned in Baghdad alongside the Nestorian Catholicos Jacob II, Theodore, the Greek Orthodox Patriarch of Antioch, and Sliba-zkha, Nestorian bishop of Tirhan.

In 767 AD, an agreement between George and Sliba-skha was made by which the Nestorians were permitted to build a church outside the walls of Tagrit, a predominantly Syriac Orthodox town, and in return, the Syriac Orthodox church of Mar Domitius in Nisibis would be allowed to be restored. Whilst George was imprisoned, David of Dara expelled George's supporters and imposed his authority on the church with the help of the Muslim authorities. David became increasingly unpopular within the Syriac Orthodox church and many of the bishops he appointed were rejected by their dioceses and driven out.

Upon the accession of the Caliph al-Mahdi in 775, George was released and was forbidden from using his title and performing his duties as patriarch by the Muslim authorities, but this was not enforced. David of Dara's unpopularity ensured that George was well received within the church and was considered the legitimate patriarch by the majority of the church. The monastery of Qartmin, former home to David of Dara, refused to acknowledge George as late as 784/785. Following his release, George travelled to Antioch in 775 where he ordained 10 bishops.

In subsequent years, bishops appointed by David of Dara were removed and George's supporters were restored. In 785, George deposed John II Keeyunoyo, Maphrian of the East, for his role in organising the opposition. In the same year, George held a synod at Kafr Nabu, near Serug, and enacted 22 canons. A debate on the phrase "heavenly bread" in connection with the Eucharist emerged during George's tenure, which was considered heretical as it implied a division in of the person of Christ. George refused to forbid the use of the phrase, however, as he was aware that this would lead to a schism within the church as it would later do during the tenure of Patriarch Quriaqos of Tagrit. George died on 1 December 790 and was buried at the Monastery of Mar Barsawma, near Melitene.

Sources
George I, Patriarch of Antioch (d. 790)
Andrew Palmer, Monk and Mason on the Tigris Frontier: The Early History of Tur `Abdin (1990) 

8th-century Syriac Orthodox Church bishops
George
8th-century Oriental Orthodox archbishops
8th-century births
790 deaths
Syriac Orthodox Church saints
Syrian Christian saints
Syrian archbishops
Upper Mesopotamia under the Abbasid Caliphate
Prisoners and detainees of the Abbasid Caliphate
8th-century people from the Abbasid Caliphate